Underclass Hero is the fourth studio album by Canadian rock band Sum 41. It is the first of two albums by the band recorded without guitarist Dave Baksh since he left a year earlier to focus on Brown Brigade. The album’s recording began between 2002 and 2003, but a trip to the Republic of the Congo halted its production, with the band opting to record different music for their third album Chuck (2004), named in honor of UN peacekeeper Chuck Pelletier, as he helped the band evacuate their hotel in the midst of a deadly fight that had broken out in the hotel’s vicinity. In 2006, they returned to finish the recordings of Underclass Hero. The album was recorded as a three piece. It was first released on July 18, 2007 in Japan by Island Records and distributed worldwide by Aquarius Records. There are no photos of the band inside the liner notes, though the front cover features a monochrome image of vocalist Deryck Whibley spitting in a hallway. In comparison to the heavy metal-inspired punk style of Chuck, Underclass Hero marked a return to the band’s signature pop punk sound. The album’s lyrical content, while not written as a rock opera, is loosely tied conceptually, with the album’s lyrics focusing on subjects such as politics, religion, family life and the romance between Deryck and Mary-Kate Olsen in 2002.

The album was a commercial success, peaking at number 1 on the Canadian Albums Chart and at number 7 on the US Billboard 200, becoming the band’s highest-charting album to date. It received generally mixed reviews from critics, with some praising its songwriting, lyrics and production, while others found it to be too long, melodramatic, and derivative. The album would become the band's last release for four years until 2011's Screaming Bloody Murder. It is also Sum 41's last release on Aquarius.

Background

In 2002, the relationship and the breakdown between Olsen and Whibley inspired him to write new music, and the band started to record a new album, which recordings were stopped in 2003. In 2004, Sum 41 released Chuck, which became a success upon release, gaining high success on the charts and receiving praise from critics. The album had a more heavy metal-influenced sound, and the band gained multiple awards for the album. The band spent most of 2005 and some of 2006 touring in support of Chuck until problems arose. In mid 2006, the band's lead guitarist Dave Brownsound had left the band due to arguing with Whibley about the band's musical direction afterwards. Whibley wanted to go to an "artistic", pop punk style while Brownsound opted for a more metal-esque sound.

Whibley did not want to have to produce the album, and admitted to "not looking forward to it". However, since they were unable to find a producer, Whibley had to take this upon himself. Whibley found himself writing several songs, each in different ways. "Usually, the first things I come up with are terrible, so I continued writing and told myself that most of them would suck", Whibley said. "So I showed everyone what I wrote and then I looked through them all and picked the best ones in the end." Whibley also admitted to being paranoid of writing, and was worried how it would turn out in the end, and Whibley referred to this as "writer's block". He said "I sometimes felt surprised once I finished writing and thought to myself 'How did that happen?'. And the writing for the album took a long time, I think I took around ten months to write these songs".

Whibley decided to be original with the songwriting, and said that "the only way to be completely original is to write about myself. So I decided to look into my thoughts that I'd never even touched and came up with all of these topics that were very deep and personal." Drummer Steve Jocz said that Whibley "spent a lot of time to himself" and that he didn't "open up". Stevo went on to say that the things Whibley wrote were so personal that even the band members did not know about them in the past. He also mentioned that Whibley "doesn't open up with anyone outside the band". Stevo and Cone were often surprised by Whibley’s songwriting, as it was more personal than the band's previous work. Whibley thought that writing more personal songs would make people like the album more because it's more "honest". McCaslin felt that writing like this was a big move because "letting the whole world know about things like Whibley not knowing his father seemed hard things to write about."

The album title's similarity to John Lennon's hit "Working Class Hero" is not a coincidence, according to the band's front man Whibley, who in an interview with Sun Media claimed Lennon as his favorite songwriter.

Recording and production

Sum 41 started the recordings of "Best Of Me" after Does This Look Infected? was released, but they paralyzed the recordings in 2003 because the band went to Congo to record a film for War Child Canada, and Chuck Pelletier saved the lives of the four guys. When they arrived in America, they decided to stop the "Best Of Me" recordings and they recorded Chuck. After Baksh's departure, the band took a break from touring in mid-2006. In November 2006, Whibley started sending in demos to their studio for recording ideas. The band would return to the studio to record a new album. During the production of the album, Whibley decided to take the band to a different and more "orchestrated" direction. Whibley did not want to produce the album in the first place, and admitted to "never looking forward to it", but since they were unable to find a producer, Whibley took the part of producing for himself. Although never intended to be a rock opera, the album was written with a unified concept holding many of the tracks together.

"After writing the songs, even if they were demos, I was going to show the others what I wrote and let them grow with the song" Whibley said. "Usually, the first things I come up with are terrible, so I continued writing and told myself that most of them would suck. So I showed everyone what I wrote and then I looked through them all and picked the best ones in the end." McCaslin mentioned the band's musical progression that they had been taking with their previous two albums and mentioned that the music got heavier. The band members have mentioned the more pop punk progression that they were going with on this album. McCaslin said that "we didn't seem like the same band we were five or six years ago, so we decided to ask ourselves why we were in a band in the first place." Jocz said "All of us knew what we wanted to achieve with this album, and what we wanted to do was a unified idea. Not necessarily a concept album, but something that's just one thing that is related and all of the songs fit in. And it's like a whole new way of looking at making a record, and I think this is the right way to do it. You should think it through."

Whibley said "With all of the ideas of where I wanted to take the music, I decided to make the most artistic punk rock record I could, but I didn't want to go overboard with it to the point where it's unlistenable. I wanted to push boundaries of what I wanted to do with what punk rock could mean, but keep things melodic at the same time." Deryck and McCaslin would often argue about the songs' sound and how the bass and guitar should progress through the songs. These arguments were mostly because Deryck wanted the songs to be "more powerful", while McCaslin wanted to have more variety in the sound.

"I had a demo form of the entire album with each song leading into the next sequence and that was how I could show everyone that I was done and all that I needed to do was go in and finish the album" Whibley said. Jocz had several drum kits put up for the recording of the album to help the feel of the songs. "There were times where I wanted to go to a really small kit with a different sound and different microphones, and then afterwards going back into a different kit" Whibley said. "We had these three different kits all set up in the studio so that Steve could play on one and then jump onto another one so the momentum was going".

Jocz and McCaslin finished their recording of the album very quickly, and it just left Deryck to record on keyboards, pianos and vocals. Whibley mentioned that the piano had an effect on his music, and he said that he heard the song in a different way, "even if I just played it on guitar. All of a sudden, I have a completely different vision of what I was playing.

Deryck would also buy several guitars for the album's recording to set "a different and unique style". Whibley said "Sometimes it takes a few  different tries with different guitars, and if you really care about the record's attitude, then you'll go through those things to really try to find out what you're hearing in your head."

"Even though the writing and recording process was very fluid" Whibley said "We all decided it would be over when it would feel right." McCaslin said that "This album felt special to us, mostly because of the lyrical content. The music is great and everything, but the lyrics went a lot deeper than we ever went before." Jocz stated "This is the direction we should've gone after All Killer No Filler, but every band goes through that phase where they question their success, and we were going through that phase where we weren't sure of what we wanted to do, but now we think that we've found out what we wanted to do, and that was on the record." Deryck said "Nothing really went wrong in the recording process here, which is odd because normally everything goes wrong during the recording, and here it seemed to go very smooth. This was probably because we knew exactly what we wanted to do here."

The overall recording and production went from November 6, 2006 to March 14, 2007. It was the first new material to be released without former guitarist Dave Baksh.

Structure and lyrical themes

The title track is focused on a theme of "us against them", similar to their previous lyrics. Although "Underclass Hero" is written from a different angle, the song refers prominently to society and the struggle of "high-class versus the underclass" instead of "youth against adults" as in All Killer No Filler. The song also uses the more classic punk-rock themes of anti-establishment. "Walking Disaster" is a classic, upbeat pop-punk song, drawing similarities from "March of the Dogs" (another song on the album). According to Whibley, the song illustrates his tattered childhood and his reflections as an adult. The song, being somewhat chronological, opens with “Mom and Dad both in denial, an only child to take the blame”, a vision of Whibley’s past, damaged by his conflicting parents. "Walking Disaster" ends on an optimistic note, “I can’t wait to see you smile, wouldn’t miss it for the world”, expressing his maturation as an adult, in the light of being able to see things differently and ultimately, understanding his childhood. "Speak of the Devil" focuses on themes of Whibley's personal thoughts on religion and if heaven and hell really exist. "Dear Father" is another chronological song focusing on the relationship between a father and son. Deryck has mentioned this song being based on his relationship with his father, who he never met.

"Count Your Last Blessings" focuses on self-abuse, leading to ruined life and sadness. In an interview, Deryck said that this song was based on drug abuse that Deryck suffered in 2002. "Ma Poubelle" is a short joke track, which wasn't meant to mean anything special. "March of the Dogs" is based on the poor choices of the government and what it can lead to. "The Jester" is an anti-Bush screed that continues on what "March of the Dogs" established. "Pull the Curtain" is a song that touches on themes like waking up to the paranoia and robotic lives that we live in society. "With Me" and "Best of Me" are songs based on love and emotion. Deryck was based on his marriage with Avril Lavigne and his friendship with Mary-Kate Olsen in 2002 when he wrote this songs. "King of Contradiction" is a song focusing on the relationship with the band's former manager. "Confusion and Frustration in Modern Times" describes the feeling of paranoia in regards to the post 9/11 world and the Bush presidency. "So Long Goodbye" is a closing track which focuses on the departure of two people. The lyrical themes in this song are based on the departure of Dave Baksh.

Musical style
Critics have consistently described Underclass Hero as a revival of Sum 41's previous pop punk style in All Killer No Filler as opposed to the heavy metal and punk rock sound found in Chuck. Along with the pop punk style of the band's beginning years, the album has also brought in an array of different instruments. These instruments include pianos, as used in tracks like "Count Your Last Blessings" and "Pull the Curtain", strings, as used in "So Long Goodbye" and "Dear Father", and horns, as used in tracks like "King of Contradiction" and "Confusion and Frustration in Modern Times". There have also been different styles of instruments used in this album. Acoustic guitar has been used in tracks such as "So Long Goodbye", and different drum kits were used in several tracks like "Walking Disaster" and "Pull the Curtain". The album has also been described as being "somewhat radio-accessible" while being "creative and artistic".

Release
On April 16, 2007, Underclass Hero was announced for release. The next day, "March of the Dogs" was released as a promotional single. On May 2, 2007, "Underclass Hero" was posted on the band's Myspace profile; the music video for it was posted online at the end of the month. The album's artwork was posted online on June 8, 2007. On July 9, 2007, "Walking Disaster" was posted on Myspace. Underclass Hero was made available for streaming on July 17, 2007 through MTV's website, and released through Island on July 24. On the same day, the band performed the album in its entirety, which was subsequently posted on their website. In August, the band played two shows in Australia with Yellowcard and performed at a few dates on the Warped Tour, alongside a few US shows with Yellowcard, Monty Are I and Amber Pacific the following month. On August 20, 2007, the music video for "Walking Disaster" premiered on MTV2's website. In September and October 2007, the band went on a tour of the US with Schoolyard Heroes, which included an appearance at the X96 Big Ass Show radio festival. In November 2007, the band announced that Whibley was suffering from a herniated disc, resulting in all of the remaining shows of the year to be cancelled. In February and March 2008, the band toured the UK, which was followed by a stint in Canada; both were supported by Die Mannequin and Social Code. They toured Australia in April 2008 with Pennywise, the Vandals and Bowling for Soup.

Reception

Critical reaction

Underclass Hero received praise for its songwriting and lyrical content, but received criticism  for its similarities to Green Day's American Idiot and My Chemical Romance's The Black Parade. On review aggregator website Metacritic, the album currently holds an average score of 50/100 based on 12 reviews, indicating “mixed or average reviews”. However, the album fared somewhat better with fans, earning a 7.1 user score, indicating “generally favorable reviews”.

The A.V. Club gave the album a positive review, calling it "the band's smartest and most mature sounding album yet." Billboard also reacted positively, saying that "its growth feels genuine and, unlike Sum 41's punk peers, its musical maturation doesn't come at the expense of that all-important snotty 'tude." On the other hand, BBC was less favorable, saying that it "has its merits", but calling it a "disappointing effort".

Sputnikmusic gave the album a 1 out of 5, saying that it "tries its best to be profound and musically challenging, however its only success is found, without exception, in the tracks which drop the pretense entirely and return to the formula which made the group popular to begin with." Mike D of Blogcritics stated that most of the album "sounds like someone else’s, not Sum 41′s. 'With Me' could easily be mistaken for Yellowcard and 'March of the Dogs' might as well be a Green Day song." However, he also added "There is one huge factor in all this that can turn the tables for this album: the lyrics. Underclass Hero is lyrically far better than anything Sum has ever done. Several times, I found myself not liking the songs as they first began, but liking them by the end." IGN gave the album a 7 out of 10, drawing comparisons to Green Day regarding the album’s sound, but said that it’s “not a bad album”. Contactmusic.com said that the album was full of "mixed results".

In 2018, Rock Sound ranked the album at #78 in their list of the Best 100 Pop Punk Albums.

Commercial performance
In Canada, Underclass Hero debuted at number 1 on the Canadian Albums Chart, selling just over 9,000 copies in its first week. In the United States, the album sold 44,601 copies in its first week and debuted at number 7 on the Billboard 200, making it their highest chart positioning to date in the U.S. As of April 2011, the album has sold 184,000 copies in the United States. As of 2013, it has sold over 1 million copies worldwide.

The album was led by the singles "Underclass Hero" and Walking Disaster; both achieving moderate radio success in 2007. The third single, "With Me", wasn't released as a single until 2008. Additionally, "March of the Dogs" was released as an album preview in April 2007 before its release, because the album "wouldn't be out until the summer".

Political backlash
The track "March of the Dogs" faced political backlash due to its radical opposition to then-United States president George W. Bush. This led to Whibley facing possible deportation in 2007 by a House of Representatives minority leader. However, this ultimately never came to pass.

Track listing
All songs written and composed by Deryck Whibley, except where noted.

Personnel
Sum 41
 Deryck Whibley – vocals, guitars, keyboards, piano, producer
 Cone – bass
 Stevo – drums, percussion

Additional musicians
 Jamie Muhoberac – keyboards
 Dan Chase – percussion
 Michael Railton – piano

Technical

 Doug McKean – engineer
 Keith Armstrong – assistant engineer
 Adam Fuller – assistant engineer
 Nathan Johns – assistant engineer
 Nik Karpen – assistant engineer
 Wesley Seidman – assistant engineer
 David Campbell – string arrangement
 Chris Lord-Alge – mixing
 Ted Jensen – mastering
 Tara Podolsky – A&R
  Rob "Just Fine" Stevenson – A&R
 Jonathan Mannion – cover photo
 Patrick Hegarty – cover design
 Brian Lauzon – package design, photography
 Matt Taylor – package design, photography

Release history

Charts and certifications

Charts

Certifications

References

External links

Underclass Hero at YouTube (streamed copy where licensed)
MTV News Interview
Jam interview
 

2007 albums
Sum 41 albums
Aquarius Records (Canada) albums
Albums recorded at Sound City Studios